Álvaro Ojeda (born 1 April 1958) is an Uruguayan writer, journalist, novelist, poet, and reviewer.

Works

Poetry 
 Ofrecidos al mago sueño (1988) (Ediciones Banda Oriental)
 En un brillo de olvido  (1988) (Ediciones Banda Oriental)
 Alzheimer  (1992) (Ediciones de Uno)
 Los universos inútiles de Austen Henry Layard (1996) (Ediciones de Último Reino, Buenos Aires, Argentina)
 Substancias de Calcedonia  (2002) (Revista Artefacto literario)
 Luz de cualquiera de los doce meses  (2003) (Civiles Iletrados)
 Toda sombra me es grata (2006) (Delfos Poesía)

Novels
 El hijo de la pluma (2004) (Planeta)
 La fascinación  (2008)  (Planeta)
 Máximo (2010)

References

20th-century Uruguayan poets
Uruguayan male poets
Uruguayan novelists
Male novelists
1958 births
Living people
21st-century Uruguayan poets
21st-century Uruguayan male writers
20th-century Uruguayan male writers